Karaşeyh can refer to:

 Karaşeyh, Adilcevaz
 Karaşeyh, Çankırı
 Karaşeyh, Çat